The SPP-1 underwater pistol was made in the Soviet Union for use by Soviet frogmen as an underwater firearm. It was developed in the late 1960s and accepted for use in 1975. Under water, ordinary-shaped bullets are inaccurate and very short-range.

Design
The SPP-1 has four barrels, each containing one cartridge. Its ammunition comes as a magazine of four cartridges which is inserted into the pistol's breech.

Its barrel is not rifled; the fired projectile is kept in line by hydrodynamic effects. As a result, it is somewhat inaccurate when fired out of water.

A double-action firing mechanism fires one cartridge sequentially for each pull of the trigger. When all four cartridges are spent, the gun can be reloaded above or below water.

The SPP-1M pistol is essentially the same as the SPP-1, with the following differences:
 It has an extra spring above the sear to improve the trigger pull.
 Its trigger guard is larger to accommodate diving gloves.

The weapon was designed by Vladimir Simonov, the cartridge by Pyotr Sazonov and Oleg Kravchenko. Simonov also designed the APS amphibious rifle.

Performance
Depth reduces range because the higher pressure closes the cavity sooner. Once the projectile is no longer supercavitating, hydrodynamic drag increases greatly, and the projectile becomes unstable.

It is manufactured by TOZ (Tulsky Oruzheiny Zavod/ Тульский Оружейный Завод) Tula Arms Plant, and exported by Rosoboronexport, the state agency for Russia's export and import of defense-related products.

Users

Variants 
The SPP-1M has been copied by Iran.

See also 
 Heckler & Koch P11
 List of Russian weaponry

References 
Notes

Sources
 Cutshaw, Charlie, “The New World of Russian Small Arms & Ammo”, 1998, (Paladin Press, Boulder, Colorado)

External links

 Picture and information 
 Technical specification
 Description, image of firearm and darts, and specifications
 Image of firearm, breech opened, and specifications

Multiple-barrel firearms
Underwater pistols
Pistols of the Soviet Union
Cold War firearms of the Soviet Union
Tula Arms Plant products
TsNIITochMash products
Flechette firearms
Military equipment introduced in the 1970s